Nola herbuloti is a moth of the family Nolidae first described by Hervé de Toulgoët in 1982. This species is endemic to Réunion in the Indian Ocean.

The wingspan is 15–16 mm and types were collected at an altitude of 1200 m in Cilaos. The author dedicated this species to the collector Claude Herbulot.

See also
List of moths of Réunion

References

herbuloti
Moths of Réunion
Endemic fauna of Réunion
Moths described in 1982